Public Service Medal may refer to one of a number of awards:

 New Zealand Public Service Medal, and New Zealand civil award
 Pingat Bakti Masyarakat (Public Service Medal), a Singaporean civil award
 Public Service Medal (Australia), an Australian civil award
 Public Service Medal (NASA), is an award given by NASA to civilians